AFC Telford United is a football club based in Telford, Shropshire, England. The club was formed in 2004 after the original Telford United, founded in 1872, folded due to financial problems. Currently members of the National League North, they play home matches at the New Bucks Head in Wellington, part of the new town of Telford. The club's colours are white and black.

History
Telford United experienced severe financial difficulties towards the end of the 2003–04 season while playing in the Football Conference following the collapse of the Miras Contracts business of chairman and sole shareholder Andy Shaw. The club went into administration, and although supporters raised around £50,000 in two months, the club's debts totalled over £4 million, resulting in liquidation on 27 May 2004. On the same day, Telford United Supporters Limited announced that a new club would be formed, which was named AFC Telford United; a new club motto, numquam obliviscere (never forget) was also adopted. In June the new club were placed in Division One of the Northern Premier League by the Football Association. Bernard McNally was appointed as manager and a new squad assembled.

The new club's first season saw them finish third in Division One, qualifying for the promotion play-offs. After beating Eastwood Town 1–0 in the semi-final, they defeated Kendal Town 2–1 in the final to earn promotion to the Premier Division. The attendance of 4,215 for the final was a club record. The following season saw them finish tenth. During the season, McNally was replaced as manager by Rob Smith. In 2006–07 the club finished third, having missed the chance to win the league when they lost 2–1 at home to eventual champions Burscough on the final day; the attendance of 5,710 being a new club record. However, they qualified for the promotion play-offs, and after a 2–0 win over Marine in the semi-final, they defeated Witton Albion 3–1 to earn promotion to the Conference North.

Telford finished second in the Conference North in 2007–08, again qualifying for the playoffs, in which they lost 4–0 on aggregate to Barrow. The 2008–09 season resulted in a fourth-place finish and another play-off campaign. After beating Alfreton Town 5–4 on aggregate in the semi-finals (a 2–0 win at home and a 4–3 defeat away), they lost 1–0 to Gateshead. The season also saw them reach the first round of the FA Cup for the first time, where they were drawn at home to Football League club Southend United. Following a 2–2 draw, the club lost 2–0 in the replay. In the FA Trophy they reached the semi-finals, losing 4–2 on aggregate to York City. However, they were victorious in the Conference League Cup, beating Forest Green Rovers 3–0 on penalties after a 0–0 draw.

In 2009–10 Telford finished eleventh in the league, resulting in the sacking of Smith and his replacement with Andy Sinton. Sinton's first season saw them finish as runners-up again. In the play-offs they defeated Nuneaton Town 3–2 on aggregate in the semi-final, before beating Guiseley 3–2 in the final with an injury-time winner by Phil Trainer, earning promotion to the Conference Premier. They also reached the first round of the FA Cup again, losing 3–1 at home to Lincoln City.

The 2011–12 season saw Telford finish twentieth, one place above the relegation zone. Another appearance in the first round of the FA Cup resulted in a 4–0 defeat at Chelmsford City. Sinton left the club mid-way through the following season, and was replaced by Mark Cooper, who remained in charge for only six games, before resigning to take a coaching role at Swindon Town. He was replaced by Graham Hyde, who lasted just two games, resigning after a defeat to Macclesfield Town. John Psaras took over for the remainder of the season, which saw them finish bottom of the division and be relegated to the Conference North. Liam Watson was appointed as manager in May 2013.

In 2013–14 Telford won the Conference North, earning an immediate return to the Conference Premier. However, the following season Watson was sacked in December with the club bottom of the division and replaced by Steve Kittrick. They finished 23rd, resulting in relegation back to the North division. However, the season also saw them reach the second round of the FA Cup for the first time; after beating Basingstoke Town 2–1 in a first round replay, they lost 1–0 at Bristol City. In August 2015 Kittrick was sacked and Rob Smith returned for a second spell as manager. They reached the first round of the FA Cup again in 2017–18 but lost 1–0 at Hereford.

Season-by-season record

Stadium

Telford play their home games at the New Bucks Head. The ground was renamed following renovation in 2000, having previously been known as the Bucks Head. During the renovations Telford United played with only two terraces in operation, with a small temporary stand situated on what is now the East Terrace and portable cabins in the car park were used for changing rooms. It had previously been home to Wellington Town and Telford United.

The ground has a capacity of 6,380 of which 2,220 is seated and 4,800 covered. The club's record attendance at the ground is 5,710 against Burscough on 28 April 2007, the final day of the 2006–07 season.

Rivalries
Shropshire rivals Shrewsbury Town are traditionally seen as the club's main rival. Matches contested between the two are known as the Shropshire derby. However, due to the league gap between the two clubs, most meetings between the two sides are in the Shropshire Senior Cup.

During United's time in the National League North through the late 2010s, a rivalry developed with near neighbours Kidderminster Harriers, based in North Worcestershire.

Current squad

Non-playing staff
Manager: Kevin Wilkin
Assistant manager: Mark Noon
Sports Therapist: Adam Paget
Youth Team Manager: Benjamin Sohier

Managerial history

Honours

Football Conference
Conference North champions 2013–14
League Cup winners 2008–09
Supporters Direct Cup
Winners 2010–11
Shropshire Senior Cup
Winners 2008–09, 2013–14, 2016–17
The Huddersfield Cup
Winners 2018

Records
Best FA Cup performance: Second round, 2014–15
Best FA Trophy performance: Semi-finals, 2008–09, 2018–19
Biggest victory: 10–1 vs Coleshill Town, FA Trophy second round, 15 December 2020
Record defeat: 14–1 vs TNS, Shropshire Senior Cup, 20 July 2017
Record home crowd: 5,710 vs Burscough, Northern Premier League Premier Division, 28 April 2007
Longest unbeaten run: 37 matches, 21 January 2006 to 9 December 2006
Most appearances: Ryan Young, 367, 2007–2014
Most goals: Andy Brown, 56, 2008–2012
Most goals in a season: Kyle Perry, 23, 2004–05
Record transfer fee paid: £5,000, Lee Moore from Tamworth in December 2006
Record transfer fee received: £25,000, Duane Courtney to Burnley, August 2005

See also
List of fan-owned sports teams
:Category:AFC Telford United players
:Category:AFC Telford United managers

References

External links

 
Football clubs in England
Football clubs in Shropshire
Northern Premier League clubs
Telford United
Association football clubs established in 2004
Supporters' trusts
2004 establishments in England
Sport in Telford
Phoenix clubs (association football)